The Beyers Naudé Square is a large city square in the center of Johannesburg, South Africa, named after Beyers Naudé, a former dominee in the Dutch Reformed Church, who was banned by the apartheid government for campaigning against apartheid. The square was originally called Market Square because it was Johannesburg's first market place after it came into existence.

History

Market square was formed soon after the gold rush in Johannesburg and later in 1913 the market was moved to Newtown when the new building, now Museum Africa and the Market Theatre, was built. Over the years the Square was given several names including Market Square Gardens, City Hall Gardens, Library Gardens, and Harry Hofmeyr Gardens

References

Afrikaner people
Squares in South Africa